Seč is a town in Chrudim District in the Pardubice Region of the Czech Republic. It has about 1,700 inhabitants.

Administrative parts

Villages of Hoješín, Javorka, Kraskov, Počátky, Proseč, Prosíčka, Přemilov, Ústupky and Žďárec u Seče are administrative parts of Seč.

Geography
It lies in the Iron Mountains and in the eponymous protected landscape area. Seč Dam is built next to the town on the river Chrudimka.

History
The first written mention of Seč is from 1318. The settlement was founded during the colonization of the Iron Mountains in the 12th and 13th centuries. In 1499, Seč became a market town, and in 1853, it was promoted to a town. It lost the town status in 1954 and regained it in 2007.

Demographics

Sights
The landmarks of the town are the Church of Saint Lawrence, built in the Renaissance style in 1610–1620, and the Renaissance castle, which dates from the turn of the 16th and 17th centuries and today serves as the municipal office.

Notable people
Vincenc Strouhal (1850–1922), physicist

Twin towns – sister cities

Seč is twinned with:
 Radzovce, Slovakia

References

External links

Cities and towns in the Czech Republic
Populated places in Chrudim District